Gagea daqingshanensis is a Chinese species of plants in the lily family, found only in the Inner Mongolia (Nei Mongol) region of China.

References

daqingshanensis
Flora of Inner Mongolia
Plants described in 2006